Delmon Damarcus Young (born September 14, 1985) is an American professional baseball outfielder and designated hitter. He played in Major League Baseball (MLB) for the Tampa Bay Devil Rays/Rays, Minnesota Twins, Detroit Tigers, Philadelphia Phillies, and Baltimore Orioles. He is the younger brother of former major league outfielder and first baseman Dmitri Young.

Minor league career
Young graduated from Adolfo Camarillo High School in 2003, located in Camarillo, California, whereupon he was drafted first overall in the 2003 Major League Baseball draft.

In 2005, Young hit .336 with 20 home runs, 71 RBI and an OPS of .968 in 84 games with the Double-A Montgomery Biscuits, winning the Southern League Most Valuable Player Award despite playing in just 60% of the games. Young was promoted to the Triple-A Durham Bulls on July 15, 2005, where he batted .285 with six home runs and 28 RBIs in 52 games. After the season was over, he was named Baseball America's Minor League Player of the Year and its number one overall prospect for the 2006 season. Young finished his minor league career with a .318 batting average.

Umpire controversy and suspension
On April 26, 2006, while playing for the Durham Bulls in a game against the Pawtucket Red Sox, Young was ejected for arguing a third strike call, after which he stared at the umpire for some time and refused to leave the batter's box. On his way back to his dugout, Young turned and tossed his bat underhand, end-over-end, toward the umpire. The bat hit the umpire on his chest and arm, but he was not seriously hurt.

The next day, Young issued an apology through his agent, claiming that he had not intended for the bat to actually strike the umpire, but acknowledging that it was unacceptable to have thrown the bat at all. The International League suspended Young for 50 games, without pay. Young had the option to appeal the suspension, but chose not to do so. The suspension ended on June 19, 2006.

This altercation was not the first Young had with an umpire during a game. In 2005, while playing for the Double-A Montgomery Biscuits, he had received a three-game suspension for bumping an umpire.

Major league career

Tampa Bay Devil Rays
On August 28, 2006, the Devil Rays called Young up to the major leagues after it was decided that Jonny Gomes had to undergo season-ending surgery. His first game at the Major League level was against the Chicago White Sox and occurred on August 29, 2006, ten years to the day his older brother Dmitri played in his first major league game. In Delmon's first major league plate appearance, White Sox pitcher Freddy García hit Young with a first-pitch fastball. After striking out in his first official at-bat, Young stroked a curveball for a  two-run home run, which was his first Major League hit.

As a 21-year-old in 2007, Young finished second in American League Rookie of the Year voting to Boston second baseman Dustin Pedroia, hitting .288 with 13 home runs and 93 RBIs. Young was also a unanimous selection to the 2007 Topps Major League Rookie All-Star Team. The selection was the result of the 49th annual Topps balloting of Major League managers.

On November 28, 2007, the Rays traded Young, along with Brendan Harris and Jason Pridie, to the Minnesota Twins for Jason Bartlett, Matt Garza, and Eduardo Morlan.

Minnesota Twins
Young had an impressive spring training. In 36 at-bats, he batted .361 with two doubles, one home run, and seven RBIs, locking up his spot in left field for opening day. Young finished the season with eight errors, more than any other left fielder in the majors, while his 11 assists led AL left fielders.

In 2008, Young played in 152 games with the Minnesota Twins, batting .290 with 10 home runs and 69 RBIs. He got off to a slow start in 2009, but had a good September, finishing with 12 home runs, 60 RBIs and a .284 batting average.

With the trade of Carlos Gómez to the Milwaukee Brewers, Young became the Twins' starting left fielder for the 2010 season. During the off-season Young shed 35 pounds, down to 200. The 2010 season ended up being Young's best offensive season to date. Young hit .298 with 21 home runs and 112 RBIs, finished tenth in the voting for AL MVP, and was a finalist for a spot on the American League All-Star roster through the online All-Star Final Vote.  On defense, he led AL left fielders in errors, with four, and had the lowest fielding percentage, at .984.

Detroit Tigers
Young was traded to the Detroit Tigers in a waiver trade on August 15, 2011, for minor league pitchers Cole Nelson and Lester Oliveros. That night, the Tigers played the Twins, and he batted in the number three spot in front of Miguel Cabrera. In his first at bat with the Tigers, Young hit a home run to left field. In 2011, he batted a combined .268 with 12 home runs (8 with the Tigers), while on defense he tied for the major league lead in errors by a left fielder, with seven.

In his first at bat in the playoffs as a Tiger, Young hit a home run to right field off CC Sabathia. In addition to his earlier post-season home run, Delmon hit the game-winning home run in the bottom of the seventh inning off Rafael Soriano, giving Detroit a 2–1 lead over the Yankees in the ALDS.  In Game 5, Young suffered a strained oblique muscle and was left off the ALCS roster. He was activated to play in Game 2. During Game 5 of the ALCS against the Texas Rangers, Young hit two home runs off C. J. Wilson, scoring three runs. He is the fourth Detroit Tiger to hit more than one home run in a postseason game (after Alan Trammell, Kirk Gibson and Magglio Ordóñez).

Delmon continued his postseason prowess in 2012. In the 2012 American League Championship Series, Young was named series MVP after hitting .353 with two home runs and six RBI in the Tigers 4–0 sweep of the New York Yankees. He batted .357 in the 2012 World Series and hit his first World Series home run in Game 4 as the Tigers lost the series to the San Francisco Giants in a four-game sweep. He is currently the Tigers all-time leader in postseason home runs, with a total of eight.

Young, who earned a reported $6.75 million for 2012, became a free agent after the season concluded.

Philadelphia Phillies
On January 22, Young and the Phillies agreed on a one-year contract worth $750,000, which could become worth as much as $3.5 million based on roster and performance bonuses.  The incentives included provisions that could allow Young to earn up to an additional $600,000 for losing weight and keeping it off during the season.  The Phillies intended for Young to start in right field. Young began the season on the 15-day disabled list after having ankle surgery in the off-season. On August 9, after batting .261 with 8 HR and 31 RBI through 80 games, he was designated for assignment to make room for Casper Wells on the active roster. On August 14, 2013, the Philadelphia Phillies released Young after he refused to play in the minors.

Back to Tampa
On August 22, 2013, Young signed a minor league deal with the Tampa Bay Rays, who assigned him to the Double-A Montgomery Biscuits. It was his second stint with the franchise. He was added to the major league roster on September 1 when the rosters expanded and was on the Rays' postseason roster as they made it to the American League Division Series.

Baltimore Orioles
Young signed a minor league deal with the Baltimore Orioles in January 2014. On March 29, 2014 it was announced that Young had earned a spot on the Orioles' Opening Day roster. Young hit his first home run as a member of the Orioles on April 8, 2014 in a 14–5 victory over the New York Yankees at Yankee Stadium.

On October 3, 2014, Young came in as a pinch hitter with 1 out and the bases loaded in the bottom of the 8th inning of game 2 of the 2014 American League Division Series against the Detroit Tigers. He swung at the first pitch and hit a base-clearing double that gave the Orioles a 7–6 lead.  The Orioles won the game and took a 2–0 lead in the series.

On December 24, 2014, Young re-signed with the Orioles on a one-year, $2.25 million deal that could reach $3 million if he hits all of the deal's incentives. He was designated for assignment on July 1, 2015. He was released on July 9.

Melbourne Aces
On October 10, 2017, it was announced that Young had signed a contract to play for the Melbourne Aces of the Australian Baseball League in an attempt to resurrect his Major League career.

Acereros de Monclova
On February 21, 2018, Young signed with the Acereros de Monclova of the Mexican League. He was released on April 18, 2018.

Pericos de Puebla
Young later signed with the Pericos de Puebla on June 18, 2018.

Venezuelan Winter League
During the 2018/2019 season, Young played for Navegantes del Magallanes of the Venezuelan Professional Baseball League, becoming the first Magallanes player to earn the MVP award for the league.  Young played in 61 of 63 games, hitting 19 home runs in 252 at bats.  No other player had more than 10 home runs that same season.

Back to Melbourne
After spending the 2018/19 winter season in Venezuela, Young returned to Australia in 2019/20 to play for the Melbourne Aces. Young signed on to play for the Aces again in the 2020/21 season.

Legal issues
On April 27, 2012, Young was arrested for aggravated harassment as a hate crime in New York City. The Tigers had been scheduled to play the Yankees later that evening. The New York Police Department said he yelled an anti-Semitic slur while he was intoxicated. Later in the day, Young issued a statement apologizing for his actions. Young was released on $5,000 bail. The Tigers subsequently put Young on the restricted list pending action by Major League Baseball.  Young was suspended by MLB for seven days without pay, retroactive to Friday, April 27, for the incident, and ordered to undergo counseling. On November 7, 2012, Young pleaded guilty to aggravated harassment. He was sentenced to perform 10 days of community service and ordered to attend a program at the Museum of Tolerance.

On February 7, 2016, Young was arrested for battery after he allegedly choked and threatened a valet at a hotel in Miami, Florida. The incident occurred when Young tried to enter a club in the hotel that was closed. After being denied entry, Young was said to have made anti-Hispanic comments towards the valet, choked him and threatened to kill him.

References

External links

1985 births
Living people
Acereros de Monclova players
African-American baseball players
American expatriate baseball players in Australia
American expatriate baseball players in Mexico
American League Championship Series MVPs
Baltimore Orioles players
Baseball players from Montgomery, Alabama
Charleston RiverDogs players
Clearwater Threshers players
Detroit Tigers players
Durham Bulls players
Lehigh Valley IronPigs players
Major League Baseball designated hitters
Major League Baseball outfielders
Melbourne Aces players
Mesa Solar Sox players
Mexican League baseball right fielders
Minnesota Twins players
Montgomery Biscuits players
Navegantes del Magallanes players
American expatriate baseball players in Venezuela
People from Camarillo, California
Pericos de Puebla players
Philadelphia Phillies players
Rochester Red Wings players
Sportspeople from Oxnard, California
Sportspeople from Ventura County, California
Tampa Bay Rays players
Tampa Bay Devil Rays players
Toros del Este players
American expatriate baseball players in the Dominican Republic
21st-century African-American sportspeople
20th-century African-American people